English alternative rock band Slowdive have released four studio albums, three compilation albums, five extended plays, five singles and four music videos.

Slowdive were formed in Reading in late 1989 by vocalist–guitarists Neil Halstead and Rachel Goswell. The duo recruited guitarist Christian Savill, bassist Nick Chaplin and drummer Adrian Sell—who left the band after they signed to Creation Records and before the release of their eponymous EP Slowdive in 1990. Released to critical acclaim from the alternative press, Slowdive was succeeded by a further two EPs, Morningrise and Holding Our Breath (1991), both of which placed in the UK Singles Chart; Holding Our Breath reached number 5 on the UK Independent Singles Chart. The band's debut studio album, Just for a Day, was released in September 1991 to poor reviews, due in part to the British press' growing disillusion with the shoegazing genre. However, Just for a Day was a minor independent success, peaking at number 3 on the Independent Albums Chart and gaining Slowdive a significant following in the United States.

In 1993, under pressure from Creation to produce a commercial-sounding album, Slowdive recruited Brian Eno and began producing new material. Souvlaki was released in May 1993 alongside the Outside Your Room EP; both received similarly negative reviews but placed in the mainstream and independent charts, with Souvlaki peaking at number 52 on the UK Albums Chart. A follow-up EP, 5, was released in November 1993 and placed at number 87  on the UK Singles Chart, however following a tour in support of its release drummer Simon Scott left the band due to creative differences.

Slowdive's third studio album, Pygmalion, was released in February 1995. Halstead had dominated the recording process, with the album only featuring minor contributions by Goswell and Ian McCutcheon, the band's new drummer. Reviews for Pygmalion were more favourable than the band's preceding releases and the album peaked at number 108 in the UK Albums Chart. However, Creation were unsatisfied and dropped Slowdive two weeks after its release. Following Slowdive's disbandment in 1995, Halstead, Goswell and McCutcheon formed Mojave 3. The band reformed in 2014, and after touring for several years, released their first new material in over two decades, Slowdive.

Albums

Studio albums

Compilation albums

Extended plays

Singles

Promotional singles

Music videos

Miscellaneous appearances

References

Bibliography

External links
 

Alternative rock discographies
Discographies of British artists